The Church of St Nicholas in Castro, Carisbrooke is a parish church in the Church of England located in Carisbrooke, Isle of Wight.

History

The church is the chapel (in Castro) of Carisbrooke Castle.

The chapel is located next to the main gate of the castle. In 1904 the chapel of St Nicholas in the castle was reopened and re-consecrated, having been rebuilt as a national memorial of King Charles I.

The chapel is home to the Isle of Wight County War Memorial, which was designed by local architect, Percy Stone (1856–1934).

Church status

The church is grouped with St Mary's Church, Carisbrooke.

Organ

The church has a two manual organ dating from 1908 by Bevington. A specification of the organ can be found on the National Pipe Organ Register.

References

External links

Church of England church buildings on the Isle of Wight